Jesse Kardon, better known by his alias Subtronics, is an American dubstep DJ and producer from Philadelphia, United States. He is best known for his song "Griztronics", a collaboration with Michigan-based electronic music artist GRiZ that peaked on Billboard's Hot Dance/Electronic Songs at the No. 9 position in late 2019. Kardon peaked at No. 10 on Billboard's Next Big Sound chart in September 2019.

Kardon is known for his mixtape series Now That's What I Call Riddim, though he has stated the mixes are not riddim despite the name. Originally released in February 2017, the series has grown to five volumes, with most containing mashups, exclusive mixes, and unreleased music as well as various DJs and producers introducing themselves during interludes. The fourth iteration, Now That’s What I Call Riddim Vol. 4, contains around 110 songs from a large number of artists. A fifth installment was released in January 2020. Kardon marked it as the last in the mix series and included songs by Skrillex, Excision, Doctor P and Boogie T.

Career

2017: "Revenge Of The Goldfish"
On April 28, 2017, Florida-based dubstep producer Midnight Tyrannosaurus collaborated with Kardon to release the song "Revenge Of The Goldfish" via Never Say Die's Black Label imprint. The song was released for free as part of Never Say Die's sixth Black Friday compilation extended play and sampled a speech originally by Klaus Heissler during an episode of the American animated sitcom American Dad.

2018: Wook Laser and SoundCloud
On April 20, 2018, Kardon released his seventh extended play Wook Laser via Never Say Die's Black Label sub-label. The 4-track extended play was well-received, with it being described as encapsulating "everything that is right in riddim at the current moment" by an EDM Sauce editor.

On July 6, Canadian electronic music duo Zeds Dead and American DJ and electronic dance music producer Jauz released a remix album of their song "Lights Go Down". Kardon's remix of the song was featured on the album, alongside remixes from by Sikdope, Duke & Jones, Gentlemans Club, Jarvis, Lick, Sqwad, Awoltalk, and Spirix.

In mid-August, Kardon's SoundCloud account was hacked and as a result, had various unreleased and private songs stolen and published by the hacker. Before, he had received a message from Los Angeles-based dubstep producer Megalodon, asking him to repost a song uploaded by an unfamiliar account. After privately messaging him, Megalodon told Kardon that he was hacked and soon blocked him. The same account later published a song by Kardon that was previously only accessible from his hard drive and private SoundCloud account.

On October 19, American record producer Herobust released a remix album of his previous song "WTF". The album, titled WTF VIP + Remixes, featured Kardon as a remix artist.

In November, multiple producers had most or all of their songs removed from online audio distribution platform and music sharing website SoundCloud for wrongful copyright claims. Among these producers were Kardon, who had lost 23 songs due to these claims.

2019: Cyclops Army, "Griztronics", and Wooked On Tronics
On April 17, 2019, Australian dubstep producer PhaseOne released "Demon Hunter", a collaboration with Kardon, as part of his album Transcendency via Disciple. EDM.com's Phil Sclippa commented on the song whilst reviewing the album, stating that it featured Kardon's "insane sound design and riddim elements, along with some entertaining samples."

On July 7, Kardon released his ninth extended play Cyclops Army via his record label Cyclops Recordings. The four-track extended play included the songs "Cyclops Army", "Glitch Fight", "They Call Me", and "Loopholes", most of which were previewed in the fourth volume of Kardon's mixtape series Now That’s What I Call Riddim.

On July 23 Canadian producer and DJ Excision released a remix album based on his fourth studio album Apex. Kardon was featured on the album with his remix of the song "Vault". While reviewing the album, Jayce Ullah-Blocks of EDM Identity briefly touched on Kardon's remix, noting that he had retained elements from the original while "fully capturing Subtronics' diverse sound palate."

On August 2, English dubstep producer Rusko collaborated with Kardon to release the song "Bounce" via the latter's record label Cyclops Recordings. The song debuted during Kardon's DJ set at Electric Forest Festival and Rusko's set at Camp Bisco earlier in the year. Writing for Dancing Astronaut, Chris Stack noted the song's influence from earlier dubstep works, utilising Kardon's "stellar syncopation and sound design" alongside Rusko's "signature elated wobbles and groove."

On August 14, American songwriter and electronic producer GRiZ  released his second extended play Bangers[2].Zip via Deadbeats. A collaboration between GRiZ and Kardon was released as one of the three songs featured on the extended play, titled "Griztronics"; a portmanteau of the two artists names. The song debuted during Kardon's DJ set at Electric Forest Festival. Writing for Dancing Astronaut, Chris Stack described the song as appealing even to "the most stubborn of dance fans". During October, the song became popular on video-sharing app TikTok, becoming the top trending song on the platform with over 259 million views in total. The song was associated with the hashtag #tastesdifferent, a similar wording to the song's pre-drop vocal "Ooh, this shit be hittin' different".

On September 10, Quebec-based vomitstep producer Snails released "Snailclops", a collaboration with Kardon, via his record label Slugz Music. In the week of September 14, 2019, Kardon peaked at number 10 on Billboard's Next Big Sound chart.

On October 2, Kardon released his tenth extended play Wooked On Tronics via his record label Cyclops Recordings. The extended play features 5 songs, including a collaboration with English music producer Moody Good.

2022 & 2023: "Fractals" and "AntiFractals" 

In 2022, Subtronics released his hit album "Fractals". This album was released by his own recording label, Cyclops Recording Label. The album itself encompassed several EDM genres, making it an experimental hodgepodge that practically any EDM fan could find something they liked. 

Then in 2023, he released his album "AntiFractals". This even more experimental album remixed every song from the original "Fractals" album and some of his prior hits. These remixes were done by both Subtronics himself as well as other well-known artists such as PEEKABOO, Sullivan King, Zeds Dead, and his soon-to-be wife LEVEL UP. This album was #4 in the Dance Charts as well as had over 50 million streams.

Discography

Albums and extended plays

As a featured artist

Charted songs

Other singles

Remixes

Awards and nominations

Accolades

References

1992 births
Living people
Dubstep musicians
Musicians from Pennsylvania
American DJs
Record producers from Pennsylvania
American male composers
21st-century American composers
21st-century American male musicians